Ilham Muzaffar oghlu Aliyev (5 May 1961 in Gadabay – 19 August 1990 in Ashaghy Eskipara) was a military serviceman of Azerbaijan Armed Forces who served during the First Nagorno-Karabakh War and was subsequently awarded the title of National Hero of Azerbaijan.

Early life and career 
Ilham Aliyev was born on 5 May 1961 in Gadabay, Azerbaijan SSR. He completed his secondary education in 1978. It was in 1980 he was drafted into the military service. In 1985, Aliyev was admitted to Bryansk Special Secondary School.

After Armenia started territorial claims against the Karabakh region of Azerbaijan in 1988 and due to that the ensuing war took place, Aliyev was sent to the Askipara village of the Qazakh District to defend the region from the offensive of the Armenian troops. He was killed during battles for that village. He was buried in Gadabay District. Aliyev was married and had a child.

Honors 

 Aliyev was posthumously awarded the title of the "National Hero of Azerbaijan" by Presidential Decree issued on 8 October 1992.
 In 2013, a documentary feature film under the title of "Heroes of the Unconquerable Castle", which communicates the life and battles of Aliyev and of three other National Heroes from Gadabay (Isgender Aznaurov, Aytakin Mammadov and Mazahir Rustamov was produced).

See also 
 First Nagorno-Karabakh War
 List of National Heroes of Azerbaijan

References 

Azerbaijani military personnel of the Nagorno-Karabakh War
National Heroes of Azerbaijan
1961 births
1990 deaths
People from Gadabay District